Simplification, Simplify, or Simplified may refer to:

Mathematics
Simplification is the process of replacing a mathematical expression by an equivalent one, that is simpler (usually shorter), for example
 Simplification of algebraic expressions, in computer algebra
 Simplification of boolean expressions i.e. logic optimization
 Simplification by conjunction elimination in inference in logic yields a simpler, but generally non-equivalent formula
 Simplification of fractions

Science
 Approximations simplify a more detailed or difficult to use process or model

Linguistics
 Simplification of Chinese characters
 Simplified English (disambiguation)
 Text simplification

Music
 Simplify, a 1999 album by Ryan Shupe & the RubberBand
 Simplified (band), a 2002 rock band from Charlotte, North Carolina
 Simplified (album), a 2005 album by Simply Red
 "Simplify", a 2008 song by Sanguine 
 "Simplify", a 2018 song by Young the Giant from Mirror Master

See also
 Muntzing (simplification of electric circuits)
 Reduction (mathematics)
 Simplicity

Oversimplification
Dumbing down